Cajon High School is located in the University District of San Bernardino, California, and is part of the San Bernardino City Unified School District.

Academics
Cajon High School is part of the International Baccalaureate Organization (IB) including the high school portion of the Middle Years Programme and IB Diploma Programme.  The school offers the AVID program as well. It has exemplary Mock Trial and Academic Decathlon teams, and numerous Cajon students are members of the California Scholarship Federation, National Honor Society and the National Forensic League Debate and Speech Honor Society (National Speech and Debate Association).

Athletics

In 1987, Cajon Football won its first CIF Southern Section Championship. In 1995 the Cajon Football team was the first team in the history of San Bernardino to go undefeated in the regular season, winning games by an average score of 42-7.  In the 2007-2008 school-year, Cajon won 12 San Andreas League championships (Arroyo Valley, Carter, Colton, Pacific, Rialto, San Bernardino, & San G) and the girls basketball team also won the CIF championship for the first time in Cajon's history (for any basketball team).  The girls basketball team also won CIF in the 2008-2009 School year.  In the 2012-2013 academic year, Cajon changed leagues to the Citrus Belt League - (Ike, AB Miller, Redlands, REV, & Yucaipa). In 2017 Cajon won its second CIF football championship 54-28 against Downey High School.

Fall

Boys' Cross Country 
Boys' Football 
Boys' Waterpolo 
Girls' Cross Country 
Girls' Golf 
Girls' Tennis 
Girls' Volleyball

Winter

Boys' Basketball 
Boys' Soccer 
Boys' Wrestling 
Girls' Basketball - San Andreas League champions: 2005(undefeated), 2006(undefeated), 2007(undefeated), 2008(undefeated), 2009(undefeated), 2010(undefeated), 2011(13-1); Citrus Belt League champions: 2014  CIF champions: 2008, 2009(32-3), 2016 CIF Division II State Champions 
Girls' Soccer 
Girls' Waterpolo

Spring

Boys' Baseball 
Boys' Golf 
Boys' Swimming
Boys' Tennis  CIF QF
Boys' Track & Field 
- CIF Southern Section D1 4x1 champions: 2022
- CIF Southern Section D1 4x4 runner-up: 2022
- CIF State High Jump champion: 2022
- Citrus Belt League champions: 2021, 2022
Boys' Volleyball
Girls' Softball 
Girls' Swimming
Girls' Track & Field

Notable alumni
 Craig Gerber, professional baseball player
 Saad Awad, professional Mixed Martial Artist
 Bob Bees, football player
 Aaron Brooks, baseball player
 Jayden Daniels, former ASU quarterback, current LSU quarterback
 Charles Johnson (wide receiver, born 1972)
 Seth Johnson, decathlete at UC Berkeley
 Damontae Kazee, professional football player
 Sebastian Tretola, former professional football player

References

Education in San Bernardino, California
High schools in San Bernardino County, California
International Baccalaureate schools in California
Public high schools in California
1971 establishments in California
Educational institutions established in 1971